Baie Sainte Anne is an administrative district of Seychelles located mostly on the island of Praslin, but also administers Curieuse Island and some other smaller islands.

References

 
Districts of Seychelles
Praslin, Seychelles